Gansky is a surname. Notable people with the surname include:

 Alton Gansky, American novelist
 Diana Gansky (born 1963), German track and field athlete
 Lisa Gansky (born 1961), American entrepreneur and author